Kalanta of the Theophany (Καλαντα θεοφανειων) is a Greek traditional carol (Kalanta) translated into English as "Theophany Kalanta." This carol is commonly sung around the Theophany and accompanied by percussion instruments such as drums and santouri.

Lyrics

References

Epiphany music
Greek traditions
Eastern Orthodox Christian culture